Sereno Elisha Payne (June 26, 1843 – December 10, 1914) was a United States representative from New York and the first House Majority Leader, holding the office from 1899 to 1911. He was a Republican congressman from 1883 to 1887 and then from 1889 to his death in 1914. He was chairman of the House Ways and Means Committee for 12 years starting in 1899. The Payne–Aldrich Tariff is perhaps the most significant legislation he introduced during that period. He was known as a staunch protectionist.

Payne was born in Hamilton, New York, on June 26, 1843. He attended the Auburn Academy in Auburn, New York, and then graduated from the University of Rochester in 1864. A lawyer, he was admitted to the bar in 1866 and practiced in Auburn, rising to become the Cayuga County district attorney from 1873 to 1879. Payne served in a number of administrative roles for the city of Auburn, as city clerk in 1867–8, supervisor in 1871–2, and president of the board of education from 1879 to 1882. He was appointed a member of the American-British Joint High Commission in January 1899.

Payne was elected as a Republican to the Forty-eighth and Forty-ninth Congresses (March 4, 1883 – March 3, 1887). He was elected into the Fifty-first Congress to fill the vacancy caused by the death of Representative Newton W. Nutting and was reelected to the twelve succeeding Congresses (December 2, 1889 – December 10, 1914). During his tenure, he served as chairman of the Committee on Merchant Marine and Fisheries (Fifty-fourth and Fifty-fifth Congresses), chairman of the Ways and Means Committee (Fifty-fifth through Sixty-first Congresses), and majority leader (Fifty-seventh through Sixty-first Congresses). He was reelected to the Sixty-fourth Congress but died before that term began.

He died on December 10, 1914, in Washington, D.C., and was buried in Fort Hill Cemetery in Auburn.

See also 
 List of United States Congress members who died in office (1900–49)

References 

Ways and Means reference
List of majority leaders
Sereno E. Payne, late a representative from New York, Memorial addresses delivered in the House of Representatives and Senate frontispiece 1916

External links

1843 births
1914 deaths
Majority leaders of the United States House of Representatives
New York (state) lawyers
County district attorneys in New York (state)
School board members in New York (state)
University of Rochester alumni
People from Cayuga County, New York
Republican Party members of the United States House of Representatives from New York (state)
People from Hamilton, New York
19th-century American politicians
Deans of the United States House of Representatives
19th-century American lawyers